Chthomaloporus is an extinct genus of Anteosaurian therapsids.

See also

 List of therapsids

References

 The main groups of non-mammalian synapsids at Mikko's Phylogeny Archive

Dinocephalian genera
Prehistoric synapsids of Asia
Prehistoric synapsids of Europe
Fossil taxa described in 1964